is a professional Japanese baseball player. He played as a pitcher for the Chunichi Dragons.

On 28 October 2016, it was announced that Yamamoto would be taking a pay cut for the 2017 season and being moved on to a trainee contract.

References

External links
 Dragons.jp
 NPB.jp

1994 births
Living people
Baseball people from Hiroshima Prefecture
Japanese baseball players
Nippon Professional Baseball pitchers
Chunichi Dragons players